Atlantis is the first album of Christian metal band, Besieged. It is the band's only full-length release before the band went on hiatus.

Critical reception
Josh Murphy (aka JoshIVM) of Indie Vision Music writes:"The band has potential to put out better records and they got a lower score because of some of the vocal issues. It felt perfect at times and sometimes I couldn’t stand it. A better suited vocalist would have gained them a higher score. The other issue was the recording could have sounded better. I look forward to what this band can do down the road. Hopefully the acquire a new vocalist soon so we can find out." The writer of Encyclopedia Metallum stated: "Besieged  Atlantis is overall an average album that unfortunately could have been much better. Best songs Balkanization, A Cold Winter Kiss, Moustache Pete, They Shake The Earth, and the first five minutes of Atlantis. I recommend this debut album only to die-hard fans of metalcore and As I Lay Dying everyone else stay away." E. Thomas of Teeth of the Divine reports:"Despite mixing the now Victory perfected mix of stern breakdowns, dual galloping European guitars, screams, impressive deep bellows, acoustic breaks and gang chants, Besieged manage to generally avoid the poppy, emo vocals (with the exception of “Moustache Pete”) or musical breaks that plague many of their peers. The song writing is what makes Atlantis standout from the similar looking pack, with some solid breakdowns (“Carved in the Walls”, “INRI”, “The Fall of Man: the Rise of Self”) very nice melodies and licks in tracks like “Balkanization”, “The Author”, “Guttersnipe”, “The Years Between”, “They Shake the Earth” and “Atlantis”, all kept a little more brutal by way of the impressive roars of vocalist Mattie, who could growl for the most brutal Death metal bands, and a stout production."

Track listing

Personnel
Besieged
 Mattie Montgomery - Vocals
 John Pichla - Lead Guitar
 Tyler Germain - Bass
 Chris Greene - Rhythm Guitar
 Josh Schroeder - Drums, All production

References

Blood and Ink Records albums
2007 debut albums